A gerbe is an algebraic construct in mathematics.

Gerbe  may also refer to:

Places
Gerbe, Aínsa, a village in the Aínsa-Sobrarbe municipality, Aragon, Spain
Communauté de communes de la Gerbe, a federation of municipalities in the Seine-et-Marne département, France

Companies and organizations
Gerbe (lingerie), a manufacturer of hosiery and lingerie founded in 1895
La Gerbe, a weekly newspaper of the French collaboration with Nazi Germany during World War II

People
Nathan Gerbe, an American ice hockey player
Zéphirin Gerbe (1810-1890) French naturalist

Animals
Gerbe's Vole (Microtus gerbei), a species of rodent in the family Cricetidae

Mathematics
Bundle gerbe